NetSmart Limited was a telecommunication service provider based in Tauranga, Bay of Plenty region of New Zealand.

Key Company Milestones 
1998 - NetSmart is born;
1999 - NetSmart starts web hosting;
2002 - NetSmart starts building a broadband wireless network in the Bay of Plenty;
2002 - NetSmart connects to the Auckland Peering Exchange;
2004 - NetSmart moves to new custom built data centre in Regency House, Tauranga;
2005 - Broadband coverage is now extended from Waihi through to Whakatane;
2007 - NetSmart builds DMR backhaul from Auckland (Sky Tower) to Tauranga, scalable to Gigabit Ethernet;
2008 - NetSmart adds fibre based backup to Auckland DMR link;
2009 - NetSmart starts trials of licensed WiMAX and starts fitout of a new data centre in Tauranga;
2010 - NetSmart launches business licensed WiMAX service in Matamata-Piako, Hauraki, Western Bay and Tauranga Districts;
2011 - NetSmart launches high speed residential licensed WiMAX broadband and phone service;
2012 - NetSmart increases its licensed WiMAX coverage to Hamilton and Cambridge, Waikato;
2012 - NetSmart increases its licensed WiMAX coverage to Bombay region, Auckland;
2013 - NetSmart acquired Skynet - Waikato region based wireless ISP;
2014 - NetSmart extends its after hour and weekend customer support;
2015 - NetSmart launched its Ultrafast Wireless product;
2015 - NetSmart started a sister company in Nairobi, Kenya;
2016 - NetSmart internet branch is acquired by Lightwire Limited existing staff of the business continues operation under the name "Eco Datacenter";

References 

http://www.agfirstbop.co.nz/?links
http://www.netsmart.nz/
http://www.ecodata.co.nz/

External links 
 World first in airshow programs
 www.rsm.govt.nz
 

New Zealand companies established in 1998
Companies based in Tauranga
Telecommunications companies established in 1998
Internet service providers of New Zealand